Heribert is a Germanic given name, derived from hari ("host") and beraht ("bright"). See also Herbert, another given name with the same roots.

Charibert of Laon (died before 762), also spelled Heribert, Count of Laon and  maternal grandfather of Charlemagne
Heribert of Cologne (c. 970-1021), saint, Archbishop of Cologne and Chancellor of Holy Roman Emperor Otto III
Heribert Aribert (archbishop of Milan) (died 1045)
Heribert Adam (born 1936), German-born Canadian political scientist and sociologist
Heribert Barrera (1917–2011), Catalan chemist and politician
Heribert Beissel (1933–2021), German orchestra conductor
Heribert Bruchhagen (born 1948), German football player, manager and executive
Heribert Faßbender (born 1941), German sports journalist
Heribert Hirte (born 1958) German legal scholar and politician
Heribert Illig (born 1947), German germanist and author
Herbert von Karajan (1908-1989), Austrian orchestra and opera conductor born Heribert, Ritter von Karajan
Heribert von Larisch (1894–1972), German lieutenant-general during World War II
Heribert Macherey (born 1954), German retired football goalkeeper
Heribert Mühlen (1927-2006), German Roman Catholic theologian
Heribert Offermanns (born 1937), German chemist
Heribert Prantl (born 1953), German journalist and jurist
Heribert Rech (born 1950), German lawyer and politician
Heribert Sperner (1915-1943), Austrian footballer
Heribert Rosweyde (1569-1629), Jesuit hagiographer
Heribert Weber (born 1955), Austrian retired football player and manager
Surname

 Sandy Heribert, French-British TV journalist

See also
Aribert

German masculine given names